Fowler's solution is a solution containing 1% potassium arsenite (KAsO2), and  was once prescribed as a remedy or a tonic.  Thomas Fowler (1736–1801) of Stafford, England, proposed the solution in 1786 as a substitute for a patent medicine, "tasteless ague drop".  From 1865, Fowler's solution was a leukemia treatment.

From 1905, inorganic arsenicals like Fowler's solution saw diminished use as attention turned to organic arsenicals, starting with Atoxyl.

As arsenical compounds are notably toxic and carcinogenic—with side effects such as cirrhosis of the liver, idiopathic portal hypertension, urinary bladder cancer, and skin cancers—Fowler's solution fell from use.  (In 2001, however, the U.S. Food and Drug Administration (FDA) approved a drug of arsenic trioxide to treat acute promyelocytic leukaemia, and interest in arsenic has returned.)

References

External links
 

Withdrawn drugs
Hepatotoxins
Arsenic(III) compounds
Potassium compounds
Patent medicines